Powerless or powerlessness may refer to:
 lack of social power or influence
 lack of physical power or strength

In media the term may refer to:
 Powerless (comics), a 2004 Marvel Comics six-issue limited series published by Marvel Comics featuring Spider-Man, Wolverine and Daredevil in a world where they don't have superpowers
 Powerless (TV series), an American television show which premiered on NBC in 2017.
 "Powerless" (Heroes), 2007 television episode
 Powerless, 2010 album by Elkie Brooks
 Powerless, the pre-release name for the 2011 album I Am the Club Rocker by Inna
 ""Powerless" (Linkin Park song), a single by Linkin Park from the album Living Things
 "Powerless" (Rudimental song), 2014 single by Rudimental
 "Powerless (Say What You Want)", a song by Nelly Furtado